Chalita Yaemwannang, nickname Lita (born 21 April 1988 in Bangkok) is a Thai beauty pageant titleholder who won Miss Universe Thailand 2013 and represented her country at Miss Universe 2013.

Early life
Yaemwannang was born in Bangkok on April 21, 1988. She grew up in Nakhon Ratchasima and attended Management Technology (Entrepreneurial Management) at Suranaree University of Technology. She holds a master's degree in Tourism Management and Marketing from Bournemouth University, United Kingdom and a PhD in English Language Studies from Suranaree University of Technology.

Miss Universe Thailand 2013
Chalita Yaemwannang won the title of Miss Universe Thailand 2013 on Saturday 11 May 2013 at Royal Paragon Hall, Siam Paragon, succeeding outgoing champion Nutpimon Farida Waller Miss Universe Thailand 2012. Chalita will receive a cash prize 1,000,000฿ (one million baht), Sprinkling Rains Crown and jewelry set from Beauty Gems, the new Toyota Prius cars and other prizes a total of over 4,000,000฿ (four million baht), she was then a guest judge in New Zealand. She represented Thailand at Miss Universe 2013 but failed to make the semifinals.

References

External links
Miss Universe Thailand website

Chalita Yaemwannang
Alumni of Bournemouth University
1988 births
Living people
Chalita Yaemwannang
Chalita Yaemwannang
Miss Universe 2013 contestants
Chalita Yaemwannang
Chalita Yaemwannang
Chalita Yaemwannang